Xandighati Mongol Ethnic Township (Uyghur: خاندىغاتى موڭغۇل يېزىسى; Uyghur Latin: Xandighati Mongghul Yëzisi; SASM/GNC romanization: Handiĝati Mongĝul Yêzisi; ；) is an ethnic township in Altay City, Altay Prefecture, Xinjiang, China. As of 2018, Xandighati Mongol Ethnic Township has a hukou population of 3,390.

History 
On June 10, 2004, a painted petroglyph was discovered in Xandighati Mongol Ethnic Township. It is composed of 15 people, 31 oxen and horses, and 4 graphic pattens.

Prior to June 12, 1954, the area was part of Lamazhao Township in Hongdun District One of Altay City. On that date, the area became Kangbutiebao Mongol Autonomous Township. In 1958, Kangbutiebao was reclassified as a people's commune, and was renamed to Dongfanghong Commune in 1967. The name was reverted back to Kangbutiebao in 1978. In 1984, people's communes were abolished, and Kangbutiebao became a Mongol Township. On January 1, 1986, the area was reorganized as the Xandighati Mongol Ethnic Township, which it remains to this date.

Geography 
Xandighati Mongol Ethnic Township is located within the northeast of Altay City.

The highest point in Xandighati Mongol Ethnic Township is Mount Hu'ergeng.

Within Xandighati Mongol Ethnic Township, the Irtysh River flows through Dabulehate Village and Jiaoshate Village. The  Xandighati River flows through the territory of Huobulete Village, Xandighati Village, Qiao'erhai Village,  and A'erqiate Village.

The ethnic township has a semi-arid climate with long, snowy winters and short, cool summers.

Administrative divisions 
As of 2022, Xandighati Mongol Ethnic Township administers the following six administrative villages:

 Xandighati Village
 Huobulete Village
 Qiao'erhai Village
 A'erqiate Village
 Jiaosate Village
 Dabulehate Village

Demographics 
As of 2010, 19.79% of Xandighati Mongol Ethnic Township's population is 14 years old or under, 74.48% is between 15 and 64 years old, and 5.73% is 65 years or older.

Kazakhs make up 49.69% of the ethnic township's population, while Mongols make up 33.00%, and Han Chinese comprise 15.37%.

At the year end of 2011, the ethnic township had an urbanization rate of 22.2%.

50.06% of Xandighati Mongol Ethnic Township's population is male, while 49.94% is female. The crude birth rate is 13.6‰ (per mille), while the crude death rate is 4.13‰, resulting in a rate of natural increase of 9.47‰.

As of 2018, Xandighati Mongol Ethnic Township has a hukou population of 3,390.

Economy 
Xandighati Mongol Ethnic Township has 8,633.3 mu of arable land, and 9,000 mu of usable grassland. The ethnic township's main crops include wheat and maize, while major cash crops include kidney beans and sunflowers.

In 2011, the value of the ethnic township's agricultural value totaled 43.182 million renminbi (RMB). That year, the ethnic township produced 1,474 tonnes of grain. 1,844.4 mu of kidney beans were planted, yielding 221.6 tonnes; 1,332 mu of sunflowers were planted, yielding 240 tonnes.

As of 2011, there are 45 commercial outlets in Xandighati Mongol Ethnic Township, and consumer retail spending totaled 1.451 million RMB. The ethnic township has two general stores or supermarkets as of 2018.

Proven mineral reserves in Xandighati Mongol Ethnic Township include iron, lead, zinc, and mica.

Education 
The ethnic township has 7 libraries with a collection of 16,000 books.

Xandighati Mongol Ethnic Township has a kindergarten staffed by four full-time teachers, which serves 91 students. The ethnic township also has one primary school staffed by 64 full-time teachers, which serves 155 students.

Culture and education 
As of 2011, Xandighati Mongol Ethnic Township was home to one culture center, and seven village-level cultural centers.

References 

1986 establishments in China
Coordinates on Wikidata
Ethnic townships of the People's Republic of China
Altay Prefecture
Township-level divisions of Xinjiang